Zurndorf is a town in the district of Neusiedl am See in the Austrian state of Burgenland.

Population

Personalities

 Andreas Grailich
 Hans Niessl, born here
 Ignaz Aurelius Fessler, born here
 
 Fritz Spiegl, born here

References

Cities and towns in Neusiedl am See District